Baugh Mountain is a summit in Gordon County, Georgia.

Baugh Mountain was named for John Baugh, the first white settler of Sugar Valley.

References

Mountains of Gordon County, Georgia
Mountains of Georgia (U.S. state)